Elmeri Kaksonen is a Finnish professional ice hockey player who currently plays for Ketterä in the Mestis. He originally made his professional debut with SaiPa of the then SM-liiga.

References

External links

1987 births
Finnish ice hockey left wingers
HPK players
Imatran Ketterä players
Living people
Mikkelin Jukurit players
Oulun Kärpät players
SaiPa players
People from Savonlinna
Tappara players
Sportspeople from South Savo